The Women's downhill competition of the Albertville 1992 Olympics was held at Meribel on Saturday, 15 February.

The defending world champion was Petra Kronberger of Austria, while Switzerland's Chantal Bournissen was the defending World Cup downhill champion and Germany's Katja Seizinger led the current season.

Kerrin Lee-Gartner of Canada won the gold medal, Hilary Lindh of the United States took the silver, and Veronika Wallinger of Austria was the bronze medalist. Seizinger and Kronberger were close behind and just off the podium, while Bournissen failed to finish. (Seizinger won the next two editions in 1994 and 1998.)

Lee-Gartner was the first from outside the Alps to win a women's speed event (downhill, super-G) at the Olympics; through 2018, she remains the only Canadian to win an Olympic speed event.

Results
The race was started at 11:15 local time, (UTC +1).

References

External links
Results
FIS Results

Women's downhill
Alp
Olymp